Arthur Siebelist (21 July 1870, Loschwitz – 4 January 1945, Hittfeld, Harburg District) was a German Impressionist painter.

Biography 
He was raised in Hamburg. In 1890, he spent a year at the "Royal School of Applied Arts" in Munich. This was followed by study trips to the Netherlands, France, Italy and England.

Other notable early members included Julius von Ehren, and Thomas Herbst, the eldest member. A common concern was to create an art school that would teach from life, rather than academically.

In 1899, Siebelist created such a school and began holding classes en plein aire. His first students included Friedrich Ahlers-Hestermann, Franz Nölken, Fritz Friedrichs and Walter Alfred Rosam. His school received support from Ernst Rump, a wealthy businessman and art collector. In 1902, he painted what is probably his most familiar work "My Students and I".

The following year he married Gertrud Bulcke (1875–1925), one of his students. In 1905, he joined the "" and later became a member of the Deutscher Künstlerbund. In 1908, he settled in Hittfeld, a suburb of Hamburg and took work as a book illustrator.

A major exhibition was held at the Kunsthalle on the occasion of his fiftieth birthday in 1920. Many of his works were destroyed during World War II. His son, also became a painter of some note.

References

Further reading 
 Carsten Meyer-Tönnesmann: Der Hamburgische Künstlerclub von 1897. Verlag Atelier im Bauernhaus, Fischerhude 1997,

External links 

ArtNet: More works by Siebelist.

1870 births
1945 deaths
20th-century German painters
20th-century German male artists
19th-century German painters
German male painters
German Impressionist painters
Artists from Dresden
19th-century German male artists